The Zé Bolo Flô State Park, formerly the José Inácio da Silva State Park is a State park in the city of Cuiabá, capital of the state of Mato Grosso, Brazil.

Location

The José Inácio da Silva State Park is in the municipality of Cuiabá, Mato Grosso.
The park is named after a wandering poet and songwriter, born José Inácio da Silva. He sold cakes and flowers in Alencastro Square in the center of Cuiabá, and was given the nickname Zé Bolo Flô from his hawker's cry.

The park provides a place to relax for residents of Grande Coxipó and the clientele of the health establishments in the park, the Adauto Botelho Hospital, the Doutor Agrícola Paes de Barros School of Public Health and the Ophiology Center.
The vegetation is cerrado forest, and there are many species of fruit trees.
There are two hiking trails, and shortcut paths used by the population.
The park has fixed grills and tables, gymnasiums, a mini-stadium and soccer field, playgrounds, landscaping, native forest, ponds, snack bars, toilets, pedestrian path and bike path, and a walkway linking in to the botanical gardens.

History

Decree 4138 of 4 April 2002 changed the name to the José Inácio da Silva – "Zé Bolo Flô" State Park.
On 26 September 2011 it was renamed to the Zé Bolo Flô State Park.
The management plan was issued for approval of 17 October 2012.
The consultative council was created of 18 December 2014.

Notes

Sources

State parks of Brazil
Protected areas established in 2000
2000 establishments in Brazil
Protected areas of Mato Grosso